ttyrec is a program or its file format capable of recording the TTY output of a text-mode program together with timestamps and then replaying it.

It is widely used for example in the NetHack community for storing game replays.

It is similar to the script command, but also allows for pausing, slowing down or speeding up playback. It can also stream the recording on the network and be used to transfer files with uudecode.

Recorders and players 

 original ttyrec (Unix)
 Term::TtyRec (Perl)
 Term::TtyRec::Plus (Perl)
 Tie::Handle::TtyRec (Perl)
 termrec (Win32, Unix)

Playback only 

 TTYPLAYER (Java)
 IPBT (Unix)

Technical file format specification 

Each chunk consists of a header using 32bit unsigned little-endian numbers:
 sec – seconds, either since the beginning of the recording (0-based) or since the Unix epoch
 usec – 0..999999 microseconds
 len – length of the payload
and the actual payload written as text with vt100 control codes.

The format does not contain any information about the character set used nor about the terminal size needed to play back the file.  termrec will inject this information as \e for UTF-8 or \e for not UTF-8 and as \eYX for size, but not all players will understand these codes.

Related formats 

 nh-recorder
 Joey Hess's modifications of script
 RealLogs

References

External links 
 How To Record And Share Terminal Screencasts Quickly
 Record and share your terminal session with shelr.tv
 

User interfaces
Computer file formats
Unix software